The 1925–26 Isthmian League was the 17th season in the history of the Isthmian League, an English football competition.

Dulwich Hamlet were champions, winning their second Isthmian League title.

League table

References

Isthmian League seasons
I